Roxalia is an unincorporated community in Monroe County, West Virginia, United States. Roxalia is east of Union.

References

Unincorporated communities in Monroe County, West Virginia
Unincorporated communities in West Virginia